Heileen is a visual novel video game series developed and published by the Italian studio Tycoon Games for the Android, Linux, MacOS, and Microsoft Windows platforms. The first game Heileen: Sail Away (also known as Heileen: Sail to the New World or just Heileen) was released in 2008 and the sequel Heileen 2: The Hands of Fate in 2009. The final installment Heileen 3: New Horizons was released on December 17, 2012. A free online prequel with the title Heileen: A Trip to Bavaria was released in 2009.

Gameplay
The player reads through the story and makes decisions at some points, which leads to different outcomes and one out of three possible endings. The player can also start a relationship with one of the other characters, including lesbian relationships. The game offers a quest system and gives them a score rating at the end of the game. The second game features 15 unique endings and an enhanced version of the original quest system in Heileen with 20 quests. The third game does not feature a quest system anymore and offers a new stat raising system instead.

Heileen: A Trip To Bavaria
Heileen: A Trip To Bavaria tells the story of a trip Heileen did on her 16th birthday to a small village in Bavaria. There she met Magdalene and they became very good friends. Heileen's uncle Otto and Lora appear in the game, as well.

Heileen: Sail Away
Heileen, a young 17th-century girl, goes on a voyage with her Uncle Otto to visit the new world, the Americas. She is accompanied by her best friend Marie and her Uncle's mistress, Lora. Based on the choices the player makes the game leads to one of three different endings. At the end, however, Heileen gets shipwrecked on a Caribbean island.

Heileen 2: The Hands of Fate
Heileen 2: The Hands of Fate takes place on a mysterious Caribbean island where Heileen was shipwrecked at the end of the first game. Her ex-slave friends Robert and Ebele helped her survive, but when Heileen discovers a deck of tarot cards representing the seven deadly sins and the seven godly virtues, she realizes that the power of the cards can help her unlock the secrets of her past and shape her future. With the tarot cards, she can escape from the island, find her true love, meet pirates, or do nothing at all.

The voiced version of Heileen 2: The Hands of Fate was released in 2010. A team of seven voice actors worked on the game: 

 Ayu Sakata – Ebele, Marie
 Steven Mane – Elias, Marco, Adam
 Lucien Dodge – Black, Morgan, Otto
 Morgan Barnhart – Lora, Juliet
 Erica Mendez – Magdalene, Marcus kid
 Dan Conlin – Robert, Jack, Additional Voices
 Mauri Majanoja – John, Jonathan

Heileen 3: New Horizons
Heileen 3: New Horizons starts about five years after the events of the second game. It starts after Heileen and her friends are rescued by pirates and they offer their services to the pirates. The theme song New Horizons was written by Matthew Myers and is performed by Irulanne.

Reception

References

External links
 Official Game Page
 
 
 

2008 video games
Adventure games
Android (operating system) games
IOS games
Linux games
MacOS games
Indie video games
Seven deadly sins in popular culture
Single-player video games
Ren'Py games
Video games developed in Italy
Video games featuring female protagonists
Video games with alternate endings
Visual novels
Windows games